General elections were held in Sint Maarten on 29 August 2014. They were the first elections since Sint Maarten became a constituent country within the Kingdom of the Netherlands in 2010, at which point the Island Council became the Estates. The result was a victory for the United People's Party, which won seven of the 15 seats in the Estates.

Electoral system
The 15 seats in the Estates were elected by proportional representation. In order to participate in the election, a party was required to obtain at least 138 signatures; 1% of the valid votes of the 2010 Island Council elections.

Campaign
Five parties secured the required number of signatures to contest the elections; the Democratic Party Sint Maarten (DP), the National Alliance (NA), the One St. Maarten People Party (OSPP), the United People's Party (UP) and the United St. Maarten Party (US). The DP, NA, UP and US were easily able to get the necessary signatures, whilst the OSPP only narrowly qualified.

The Social Reform Party led by Jacinto Mock, a former National Alliance candidate, obtained fewer than 80 signatures, and was initially declared unable to run. However, it did ultimately contest the elections.

Results

References

Elections in Sint Maarten
Sint Maarten
General election
Sint Maarten